Düvenci can refer to:

 Düvenci, Çorum
 Düvenci, Erciş